Yudai Arashiro (born 3 July 1995) is a Japanese cyclist, who currently rides for UCI Continental team .

Major results
2017
 1st  Time trial, National Under-23 Road Championships
2018
 3rd Road race, National Road Championships
2022
 2nd Road race, National Road Championships

References

External links

1995 births
Living people
Japanese male cyclists